This is a list of notable software systems that are used for visualizing macromolecules.

Key 
The tables below indicate which types of data can be visualized in each system:

See also 
 Biological data visualization
 Comparison of nucleic acid simulation software
 Comparison of software for molecular mechanics modeling
 List of microscopy visualization systems
 List of open-source bioinformatics software
 Molecular graphics
 Molecule editor

References

External links 

  A rather detailed, objective, and technical assessment of about 20 tools.
 
 
 

Chemistry software
molecular graphics systems
Molecular modelling